Duane Bradley Clark (born July 16, 1963) is an American–Canadian television director, producer and screenwriter. He is the son of television personality Dick Clark and his second wife, Loretta Martin.

He attended the film program at UCLA, where he graduated with honors and was inducted into Phi Beta Kappa and was a member of the Lambda Chi Alpha fraternity.

He directed episodes for a number of television series, Highlander: The Series, Dark Angel, The Practice, Boston Public, CSI: Crime Scene Investigation, CSI: Miami, CSI: NY and the mini-series XIII.

Clark has been a resident of the US and the UK (2005–14), and he has dual citizenship of the US and Canada.

Filmography

References

External links
  (archived)

American film directors
American male screenwriters
American television directors
American television producers
American television writers
University of California, Los Angeles alumni
UCLA Film School alumni
American male television writers
Place of birth missing (living people)
1965 births
Living people